Below is a list of all the Asian countries and territories, in order of geographical area. Asia's total geographical area is 44,526,316 km².

Note: Some of these countries are transcontinental or have part of their territory located in a continent other than Asia. These countries are marked with an asterisk (*).

See also
List of Asian countries by population
List of African countries by area
List of European countries by area
List of North American countries by area
List of South American countries by area
List of Oceanian countries by area

References

Countries by geographical area
Asian countries
Area